In mathematics, convenient vector spaces are  locally convex vector spaces satisfying a very mild completeness condition. 
 
Traditional differential calculus is effective in the analysis of finite-dimensional vector spaces and for Banach spaces. Beyond Banach spaces, difficulties begin to arise; in particular, composition of continuous linear mappings stop being jointly continuous at the level of Banach spaces, for any compatible topology on the spaces of continuous linear mappings.

Mappings between convenient vector spaces are smooth or  if they map smooth curves to smooth curves. This leads to a Cartesian closed category of smooth mappings between -open subsets of convenient vector spaces (see property 6 below). The corresponding calculus of smooth mappings is called convenient calculus.
It is weaker than any other reasonable notion of differentiability, it is easy to apply, but there are smooth mappings which are not continuous (see Note 1).
This type of calculus alone is not useful in solving equations.

The -topology

Let  be a locally convex vector space. A curve  is called smooth or  if all derivatives exist and are continuous. Let  be the space of smooth curves. It can be shown that the set of smooth curves does not depend entirely on the locally convex 
topology of  only on its associated bornology (system of bounded sets); see [KM], 2.11.
The final topologies with respect to the following sets of mappings into  coincide; see [KM], 2.13.
 
 The set of all Mackey convergent sequences  (there exists a sequence  with  bounded).
In general (on the space  of smooth functions with compact support on the real line, for example) it is finer than the given locally convex topology, it is not a vector space topology, since addition is no longer jointly continuous. Namely, even 
If  is a Fréchet space, then

Convenient vector spaces
A locally convex vector space  is said to be a convenient vector space if one of the following equivalent conditions holds (called  -completeness); see [KM], 2.14.
 Equivalently, for all , the dual of all bounded linear functionals. 
This is visibly a mild completeness requirement.
 If  is bounded closed absolutely convex, then  is a Banach space.
Here a mapping  is called  if all 

Smooth mappings
Let  and  be convenient vector spaces, 
and let  be -open. 
A mapping  is called smooth or 
, if the composition  for all . See [KM], 3.11.

Main properties of smooth calculus

1. For maps on Fréchet spaces this notion of smoothness coincides with all other reasonable definitions. On  this is a non-trivial theorem, proved by Boman, 1967. See also [KM], 3.4.

2. Multilinear mappings are smooth if and only if they are bounded ([KM], 5.5).

3. If  is smooth then the derivative  is smooth, and also  is smooth where  denotes the space of all bounded linear mappings with the topology of uniform convergence on bounded subsets; see [KM], 3.18.

4. The chain rule holds ([KM], 3.18).

5. The space  of all smooth mappings  is again a convenient vector space where the structure is given by the following injection, where  carries the topology of compact convergence in each derivative separately; see [KM], 3.11 and 3.7.

6. The exponential law holds ([KM], 3.12): For -open  the following mapping is a linear diffeomorphism of convenient vector spaces. 

This is the main assumption of variational calculus. Here it is a theorem. This property is the source of the name convenient, which was borrowed from (Steenrod 1967).

7. Smooth uniform boundedness theorem ([KM], theorem 5.26). 
A linear mapping  is smooth (by (2) equivalent to bounded) if and only if  is smooth for each . 

8.  The following canonical mappings are smooth. This follows from the exponential law by simple categorical reasonings, see [KM], 3.13.

Related convenient calculi
Convenient calculus of smooth mappings appeared for the first time in [Frölicher,  1981], [Kriegl 1982, 1983].
Convenient calculus (having properties 6 and 7) exists also for:
 Real analytic mappings (Kriegl, Michor, 1990; see also [KM], chapter II). 
 Holomorphic mappings (Kriegl, Nel, 1985; see also [KM], chapter II). The notion of holomorphy is that of [Fantappié, 1930-33].
 Many classes of Denjoy Carleman ultradifferentiable functions, both of Beurling type and of  Roumieu-type [Kriegl, Michor, Rainer, 2009, 2011, 2015].
 With some adaptations, [FK]. 
 With more adaptations, even   (i.e., the -th derivative is Hölder-continuous with index ) ([Faure, 1989], [Faure, These Geneve, 1991]).
The corresponding notion of convenient vector space is the same (for their underlying real vector space in the complex case) for all these theories.

Application: Manifolds of mappings between finite dimensional manifolds

The exponential law 6 of convenient calculus allows for very simple proofs of the basic facts about manifolds of mappings. 
Let  and  be finite dimensional smooth manifolds where  is compact. We use an 

It induces an atlas of charts on the space  of all smooth mappings  as follows.

Now the basics facts follow in easily.
Trivializing the pull back  vector bundle  and applying the exponential law 6 leads to the diffeomorphism
 
All chart change mappings are smooth since they map smooth curves to smooth curves:  

Thus is a smooth manifold modeled on Fréchet spaces. The space of all smooth curves in this manifold is given by

Since it visibly maps smooth curves to smooth curves, composition
  
is smooth. As a consequence of the chart structure, the tangent bundle of the manifold of mappings is given by

Regular Lie groups
Let  be a connected smooth Lie group modeled on convenient vector spaces, with Lie algebra 
. Multiplication and inversion are denoted by:

The notion of a regular Lie group is originally due to Omori et al. for Fréchet Lie groups, was weakened and made more transparent by J. Milnor, and was then carried over to convenient Lie groups; see [KM], 38.4.

A Lie group  is called regular if the following two conditions hold:
It turn out that  is uniquely determined by its initial value , if it exists. That is,

If   is the unique solution for the curve  required above, we denote  
 
 The following mapping is required to be smooth:

If  is a constant curve in the Lie algebra, then  is the group exponential mapping.

Theorem. For each compact manifold , the diffeomorphism group  is a regular Lie group.

Composition is smooth by restriction.
, so by the finite dimensional implicit function theorem,  is smooth. So inversion maps smooth curves to smooth curves, and thus inversion is smooth.
Then the flow operator  of the corresponding autonomous vector field  on  induces the evolution operator via
 
which satisfies the ordinary differential equation 

Given a smooth curve in the Lie algebra,
then the solution of the ordinary differential equation depends smoothly also on the further variable ,
thus  maps smooth curves of time dependent vector fields to smooth curves of 
diffeomorphism. QED.

The principal bundle of embeddings

Theorem:   is a principal fiber bundle with structure group .

. Choose a tubular neighborhood 

This is the required local splitting. QED

Further applications
An overview of applications using geometry of shape spaces and diffeomorphism groups can be found in [Bauer, Bruveris, Michor, 2014].

Notes

References

 Bauer, M., Bruveris, M., Michor, P.W.: Overview of the Geometries of Shape Spaces and Diffeomorphism Groups. Journal of Mathematical Imaging and Vision, 50, 1-2, 60-97, 2014. (arXiv:1305.11500)
 Boman, J.: Differentiability of a function and of its composition with a  function of one variable, Mathematica Scandinavia vol. 20 (1967), 249–268.
 Faure, C.-A.: Sur un théorème de Boman, C. R. Acad. Sci., Paris}, vol. 309 (1989), 1003–1006.
 Faure, C.-A.: Théorie de la différentiation dans les espaces convenables, These, Université de Genève, 1991.
 Frölicher, A.: Applications lisses entre espaces et variétés de Fréchet, C. R. Acad. Sci. Paris, vol. 293 (1981), 125–127.
 [FK] Frölicher, A., Kriegl, A.: Linear spaces and differentiation theory. Pure and Applied Mathematics,	J. Wiley, Chichester, 1988.
 Kriegl, A.: Die richtigen Räume für Analysis im Unendlich – Dimensionalen,	Monatshefte für Mathematik vol. 94 (1982) 109–124.
 Kriegl, A.: Eine kartesisch abgeschlossene Kategorie glatter Abbildungen zwischen beliebigen lokalkonvexen Vektorräumen, Monatshefte für Mathematik vol. 95 (1983) 287–309.
 [KM] Kriegl, A., Michor, P.W.: The Convenient Setting of Global Analysis. Mathematical Surveys and Monographs, Volume: 53, American Mathematical Society, Providence, 1997. (pdf)
 Kriegl, A., Michor, P. W., Rainer, A.: The convenient setting for non-quasianalytic Denjoy–Carleman differentiable mappings, Journal of Functional Analysis, vol. 256 (2009), 3510–3544. (arXiv:0804.2995)
 Kriegl, A., Michor, P. W., Rainer, A.: The convenient setting for quasianalytic Denjoy–Carleman differentiable mappings, Journal of Functional Analysis, vol. 261 (2011), 1799–1834. (arXiv:0909.5632)
 Kriegl, A., Michor, P. W., Rainer, A.: The convenient setting for Denjoy-Carleman differentiable mappings of Beurling and Roumieu type. Revista Matemática Complutense (2015). doi:10.1007/s13163-014-0167-1. (arXiv:1111.1819)
 Michor, P.W.: Manifolds of mappings and shapes. (arXiv:1505.02359)
 Steenrod, N. E.: A convenient category for topological spaces, Michigan Mathematical Journal, vol. 14 (1967), 133–152.

Multivariable calculus
Differential calculus
Calculus of variations